The second season of the American television series Raising Hope premiered on September 20, 2011, on Fox. The show moved to its new time slot, airing on Tuesday at 9:30pm ET to make way for the new comedy series New Girl, before moving again to 8:00 pm ET in mid-season. This season contains 22 episodes.

Cast

Main cast
 Lucas Neff as James "Jimmy" Chance
 Martha Plimpton as Virginia Chance
 Garret Dillahunt as Burt Chance
 Shannon Woodward as Sabrina Collins
 Gregg Binkley as Barney Hughes
 Cloris Leachman as Barbara June "Maw Maw" Thompson

Recurring cast
 Baylie and Rylie Cregut as Hope Chance 
 Kate Micucci as Shelley
 Todd Giebenhain as Frank Marolla
 Ryan Doom as Wyatt Gill
 Bijou Phillips as Lucy Carlyle
 Eddie Steeples as Tyler, the Gas Man
 Dan Coscino as Dancin' Dan
 Carla Jimenez as Rosa Flores
 Lou Wagner as Wally Phipps

Recurring cast in flashback
 Greyson Chance as adolescent Jimmy
 Kelly Heyer as teenage Virginia
 Cameron Moulene as teenage Burt
 Laura Avey as teenage Delilah
 Trace Garcia as 4-year-old Jimmy (credited as Trace!)

Guest cast
 Stephen Root as Captain Collins
 Sean Bridgers as Jack
 Whit Hertford as Ross
 Amy Sedaris as Delilah
 Greg Germann as Dale Carlyle
 Camden Garcia as Trevor
 Shirley Jones as Christine Chance
 Lee Majors as Ralph Chance
 Ethan Suplee as Andrew
 Andrew Dice Clay as Himself
 Patton Oswalt as Rubin
 Fred Willard as Mr. Swift
 Dale Dickey as Patty
 Timothy Stack as TV's Tim Stack
 Ashley Tisdale as Mary-Louise
 Katy Perry as Rikki Hargrove
 Mary Birdsong as Mayor Suzie Hellmann
 Gary Anthony Williams as News Reporter
 Vivica A. Fox as Sarah Louise
 David Krumholtz as Carl
 Travis Van Winkle as Philip
 Desi Lydic as Uma
 Jorge Diaz as Randy
 Anthony Anderson as Neighbor
 Nancy Grace as Herself
 Jason Lee as Smokey Floyd
 Jaime Pressly as Donna
 Ed Begley, Jr. as Himself
 Jackie Hoffman as Sylvia Barnes
 Amy Hill as Judge

Production
On January 10, 2011, Fox renewed Raising Hope for a second season with a 22 episode order. From the beginning of this season, Cloris Leachman and Gregg Binkley were both upgraded to series regulars. Episode four aired following The X Factor on Wednesday, October 5, 2011 at 9:30pm, instead of its regular time slot of Tuesday at 9:30pm. Production for this season ended on February 16, 2012. On March 6, 2012, the show moved to 8pm as part of the mid-season two-hour comedy block, although the last two episodes of the season were shown in the original 9:30pm time slot.

Episodes

Ratings

U.S.

References

External links 
 
 List of Raising Hope episodes at MSN TV
 List of Raising Hope episodes at The Futon Critic

2011 American television seasons
2012 American television seasons
Raising Hope